James William Dietz (born January 12, 1949) is an American rower and rowing coach.

Dietz was born in 1949 in The Bronx. He obtained his education at Northeastern University, from where he graduated in 1972.

Dietz had a very long rowing career, lasting from 1967 (when he won gold at the 1967 World Rowing Junior Championships in Ratzeburg in single sculls) until he retired from competitive rowing in 1983. He started at Pan American Games in 1967, 1975, 1979, and 1983. He competed in single sculls at the 1971 European Rowing Championships (sixth place) and again two years later in 1973 (eleventh). He competed at World Rowing Championships in 1970, 1974, 1975, and in 1979.

He competed at the 1972 Summer Olympics in Munich in the single sculls and came fifth. He went to the 1976 Summer Olympics in Montreal and came seventh in the  single sculls. He made the team for the 1980 Summer Olympics but did not travel to Moscow due to the boycott initiated by the United States.

Dietz later worked as a rowing coach, including for US national teams. He was the head coach of the University of Massachusetts women’s rowing team from 1996 to 2019.  The Minutewomen have dominated regular-season racing and captured 16 Atlantic 10 Championships under Dietz's direction. His squads have produced 69 Atlantic 10 gold medals in 12 separate league championship events, including 13 by his Varsity 8+ boats. For his efforts, Dietz has been honored as Atlantic 10 Conference Coach of the Year a league-record 10 occasions, including during three of the last four campaigns.

References

External links
 
 
 

1949 births
Living people
American male rowers
Olympic rowers of the United States
Rowers at the 1972 Summer Olympics
Rowers at the 1976 Summer Olympics
Pan American Games medalists in rowing
Pan American Games gold medalists for the United States
Pan American Games silver medalists for the United States
Pan American Games bronze medalists for the United States
Rowers at the 1967 Pan American Games
Rowers at the 1975 Pan American Games
Rowers at the 1979 Pan American Games
Rowers at the 1983 Pan American Games
Medalists at the 1967 Pan American Games
Medalists at the 1975 Pan American Games
Medalists at the 1979 Pan American Games
Medalists at the 1983 Pan American Games
World Rowing Championships medalists for East Germany